Mike Mayer is an American writer, director and producer of feature and short films.  He was born in Los Angeles, California, where he lives with his wife, Sasha.

Mayer is sometimes credited as Michael Mayer, as in the case of his work with Mediocre Films.

Films 
Mayer wrote, directed and produced the award-winning short film, The Robber, which became one of the first featured shorts ever to air on HBO and Cinemax.  Mayer co-wrote and directed the feature film Graduation starring Chris Lowell, Shannon Lucio, Chris Marquette, Riley Smith, Aimee Garcia, Adam Arkin, and Huey Lewis.

Trivia 

Mayer made his short film "The Robber" while working for future Graduation producer, Jane Sindell, at Creative Artists Agency.

Mayer has volunteered as a mentor and head mentor with the Young Storytellers Program.

In college, Mayer was a first team All-American fencer in Sabre.

References

External links
 
 Graduation trailer on YouTube.

American male screenwriters
Writers from Los Angeles
Living people
Film directors from Los Angeles
Screenwriters from California
Year of birth missing (living people)